Luz Ramos (April 20, 1987) is a Mexican television actress and film, known for her roles in biographical series such as El Vato and Hasta que te conocí. She was cast as the star of the series based on the life of Jenni Rivera, Su nombre era Dolores, la Jenn que yo conocí.

Filmography

Films

Television

References

External links 

21st-century Mexican actresses
Living people
Mexican film actresses
Mexican telenovela actresses
Mexican television actresses
1987 births
People from Autlán, Jalisco